Azalea (known in Korean as Dallae) is a chimpanzee housed at the Korea Central Zoo in Pyongyang, North Korea. She is best known for her ability to smoke cigarettes, a behavior that has garnered criticism from multiple animal rights organizations.

Smoking
Azalea smokes about one pack of cigarettes a day, though she reportedly does not inhale when smoking. She is able to light her own cigarettes using a lighter and has also learned to light a cigarette by touching it to the end of a lit cigarette. Azalea's trainers support her smoking, providing her with both supplies and encouragement. Azalea is popular with the zoo's visitors, many of whom find her funny. Smoking is a widespread habit among men in North Korea, with approximately 45% of men smoking on a regular basis and 30% of men dying from tobacco-related illnesses.

Azalea is also able to perform tricks like dancing, bowing, and touching her nose.

Criticism 

The Zoo has been criticized by PETA President Ingrid Newkirk, who stated that it was "cruel to willfully addict a chimpanzee to tobacco for human amusement" and that smoking was as dangerous to Azalea as it is to humans.

The Animal Legal Defense Fund Director of Litigation has described the keeping and treatment of Azalea as part of a larger problem with displaying captive wildlife for profit, stating that "they are made to do unnatural and freakish things to attract gawkers".

Azalea is not the only animal at the zoo known for "less-than-ethical" habits, with other exhibits including a dog that can manipulate an abacus, basketball-playing monkeys, and a group of doves that perform a figure-skating routine.

See also
Smoking in North Korea
List of individual apes

References

1996 animal births
Smoking
Individual chimpanzees